Xiezuo Lake is a lake in the northeastern Qarhan Playa north of Golmud in Dulan County, Haixi Prefecture, Qinghai Province, China. Like the other lakes of the surrounding Qaidam Basin, it is extremely saline.

Geography 
It lies northeast of Dabusun Lake, north of Tuanjie Lake, and west of North Hulsan Lake and is periodically fed by the Quanji River  Quánjí Hé) and mineral springs from the north. Although the volume of water from the springs is much smaller, their much higher concentration of solutes is important to the lake's chemical composition. The lake's depth usually does not exceed .

The crescent shape of the lake reflects its bed's origin as the alluvial fan of a now-dry river.

Gallery

See also 
 Qarhan Playa & Qaidam Basin
 List of lakes and saltwater lakes of China

Notes

References

Citations

Bibliography 
 .
 .
 .
 .
 .

Lakes of China
Lakes of Qinghai
Haixi Mongol and Tibetan Autonomous Prefecture